In quantum mechanics, the results of the quantum particle in a box can be used to look at the equilibrium situation for a quantum ideal gas in a box which is a box containing a large number of molecules which do not interact with each other except for instantaneous thermalizing collisions. This simple model can be used to describe the classical ideal gas as well as the various quantum ideal gases such as the ideal massive Fermi gas, the ideal massive Bose gas as well as black body radiation (photon gas) which may be treated as a massless Bose gas, in which thermalization is usually assumed to be facilitated by the interaction of the photons with an equilibrated mass.

Using the results from either Maxwell–Boltzmann statistics, Bose–Einstein statistics or Fermi–Dirac statistics, and considering the limit of a very large box, the Thomas–Fermi approximation (named after Enrico Fermi and Llewellyn Thomas) is used to express the degeneracy of the energy states as a differential, and summations over states as integrals. This enables thermodynamic properties of the gas to be calculated with the use of the partition function or the grand partition function. These results will be applied to both massive and massless particles. More complete calculations will be left to separate articles, but some simple examples will be given in this article.

Thomas–Fermi approximation for the degeneracy of states

For both massive and massless particles in a box, the states of a particle are
enumerated by a set of quantum numbers . The magnitude of the momentum is given by

where h is Planck's constant and L is the length of a side of the box. Each possible state of a particle can be thought of as a point on a 3-dimensional grid of positive integers. The distance from the origin to any point will be

Suppose each set of quantum numbers specify f states where f is the number of internal degrees of freedom of the particle that can be altered by collision. For example, a spin  particle would have f=2, one for each spin state. For large values of n, the number of states with magnitude of momentum less than or equal to p from the above equation is approximately

which is just f times the volume of a sphere of radius n divided by eight since only the octant with positive ni is considered. Using a continuum approximation, the number of states with magnitude of momentum between p and p+dp is therefore

where V=L3 is the volume of the box. Notice that in using this continuum approximation, also known as Thomas−Fermi approximation, the ability to characterize the low-energy states is lost, including the ground state where ni = 1. For most cases this will not be a problem, but when considering Bose–Einstein condensation, in which a large portion of the gas is in or near the ground state, the ability to deal with low energy states becomes important.

Without using any approximation, the number of particles with energy εi is given by

(See Maxwell–Boltzmann statistics, Bose–Einstein statistics, and Fermi–Dirac statistics.)

Using the Thomas−Fermi approximation, the number of particles dNE with energy between E and E+dE is:

where  is the number of states with energy between E and E+dE.

Energy distribution

Using the results derived from the previous sections of this article, some distributions for the gas in a box can now be determined.

where 
, probability that a state which has the value  is occupied by a particle
,  total number of particles.

It follows that:

For a particle in a box (and for a free particle as well), the relationship between energy  and momentum  is different for massive and massless particles. For massive particles,

while for massless particles,

Using these relationships,

  For massive particles  where  is the thermal wavelength of the gas.  This is an important quantity, since when  is on the order of the inter-particle distance , quantum effects begin to dominate and the gas can no longer be considered to be a Maxwell–Boltzmann gas.
  For massless particles  where  is now the thermal wavelength for massless particles.

Specific examples

The following sections give an example of results for some specific cases.

Massive Maxwell–Boltzmann particles

For this case:

Integrating the energy distribution function and solving for N gives

Substituting into the original energy distribution function gives

which are the same results obtained classically for the Maxwell–Boltzmann distribution. Further results can be found in the classical section of the article on the ideal gas.

Massive Bose–Einstein particles
For this case:

where 

Integrating the energy distribution function and solving for N gives the particle number

where Lis(z) is the polylogarithm function. The polylogarithm term must always be positive and real, which means its value will go from 0 to ζ(3/2) as z goes from 0 to 1. As the temperature drops towards zero,  will become larger and larger, until finally  will reach a critical value  where z=1 and

where  denotes the Riemann zeta function. For temperatures below this critical temperature, the above equation for the particle number has no solution. The critical temperature is the temperature at which a Bose–Einstein condensate begins to form. The problem is, as mentioned above, that the ground state has been ignored in the continuum approximation. It turns out, however, that the above equation for particle number expresses the number of bosons in excited states rather well, and thus: 

where the added term is the number of particles in the ground state. The ground state energy has been ignored. This equation will hold down to zero temperature. Further results can be found in the article on the ideal Bose gas.

Massless Bose–Einstein particles (e.g. black body radiation)
For the case of massless particles, the massless energy distribution function must be used. It is convenient to convert this function to a frequency distribution function:

where  is the thermal wavelength for massless particles. The spectral energy density (energy per unit volume per unit frequency) is then

Other thermodynamic parameters may be derived analogously to the case for massive particles. For example, integrating the frequency distribution function and solving for N gives the number of particles:

The most common massless Bose gas is a photon gas in a black body. Taking the "box" to be a black body cavity, the photons are continually being absorbed and re-emitted by the walls. When this is the case, the number of photons is not conserved. In the derivation of Bose–Einstein statistics, when the restraint on the number of particles is removed, this is effectively the same as setting the chemical potential (μ) to zero. Furthermore, since photons have two spin states, the value of f is 2. The spectral energy density is then

which is just the spectral energy density for Planck's law of black body radiation. Note that the Wien distribution is recovered if this procedure is carried out for massless Maxwell–Boltzmann particles, which approximates a Planck's distribution for high temperatures or low densities.

In certain situations, the reactions involving photons will result in the conservation of the number of photons (e.g. light-emitting diodes, "white" cavities). In these cases, the photon distribution function will involve a non-zero chemical potential. (Hermann 2005)

Another massless Bose gas is given by the Debye model for heat capacity. This model considers a gas of phonons in a box and differs from the development for photons in that the speed of the phonons is less than light speed, and there is a maximum allowed wavelength for each axis of the box. This means that the integration over phase space cannot be carried out to infinity, and instead of results being expressed in polylogarithms, they are expressed in the related Debye functions.

Massive Fermi–Dirac particles (e.g. electrons in a metal)
For this case:

Integrating the energy distribution function gives

Further results can be found in the article on the ideal Fermi gas. Applications of the Fermi gas are found in the free electron model, the theory of white dwarfs and in degenerate matter in general.

See also 

 Gas in a harmonic trap

References 

 
 
 
 
 
 Vu-Quoc, L., Configuration integral (statistical mechanics), 2008. this wiki site is down; see this article in the web archive on 2012 April 28.

Statistical mechanics